Leonard George ("Toby") Colbeck (1 January, 1884 – 3 January, 1918) was an English first-class cricketer active from 1905–14, playing for Middlesex. He was born in South Harrow. He died off the Cape of Good Hope in  during World War I, in which he had been awarded the Military Cross.

References

1884 births
1918 deaths
English cricketers
Middlesex cricketers
Cambridge University cricketers
Marylebone Cricket Club cricketers
Europeans cricketers
British military personnel killed in World War I
British Army personnel of World War I
Royal Field Artillery officers
Recipients of the Military Cross